10 Precentor's Court is an historic building in the English city of York, North Yorkshire.

The building is a Grade II* listed structure, standing on Precentor's Court.  It stands perpendicular to Fenton House at the western end of the street.

Parts of the house date to the 15th-century: stone walls on three sides of the building, and in the entrance hall, the arch of a fireplace.  The remainder of that house was demolished in the early 18th century, when the present building was constructed, with a new brick facade facing Precentor's Court.  The building was altered internally in the mid-19th century, when a bay was added to the rear.  In about 1900, the north-west wing of the house was entirely rebuilt, and the roof of the building was raised, adding an attic. 

Inside the house, in the ground floor study, there are 16th century beams, 17th century panelling, and an 18th century fireplace.   The staircase is early-18th century but has been rebuilt, while the north-east bedroom has an 18th century fireplace, moved from elsewhere.

The gates and railings in front of the house are Grade II listed.

Reverend George Addleshaw (1906–1982) lived at the property in 1952.

See also

Grade II* listed buildings in the City of York

References

Precentor's Court
Houses in North Yorkshire
18th-century establishments in England
Precentor's Court 10
Precentor's Court 10
Grade II* listed houses